The 2022–23 North Dakota Fighting Hawks men's ice hockey season will be the 81st season of play for the program. They represent the University of North Dakota in the 2022–23 NCAA Division I men's ice hockey season and for the 10th season in the National Collegiate Hockey Conference (NCHC). The Fighting Hawks will be coached by Brad Berry, in his eighth season, and play their home games at Ralph Engelstad Arena.

Season

Departures

Recruiting

Roster
As of August 24, 2022.

Standings

Schedule and results

|-
!colspan=12 style=";" | Exhibition

|-
!colspan=12 style=";" | Regular Season

|-
!colspan=12 style=";" |

Scoring statistics

Goaltending statistics

Rankings

References

2022-23
North Dakota Fighting Hawks
North Dakota Fighting Hawks
North Dakota Fighting Hawks
North Dakota Fighting Hawks